Hernan Aguilar is an Argentine film director, writer and producer. He is a prominent figure of cinema in his country, and known for directing Madraza (2017) aka "Godmother". Madraza won a Best Film Award at Sitges International Film Festival in 2017.

Life and career 
Aguilar was born in Buenos Aires, Argentina. He started studying Business Administration, at Di Tella University but dropped out after three years. His debut as director was in 1999, with the short Cachorros, a S16mm black and white film, starring a 9-year-old boy and a dog. Aguilar traveled to the United States and entered UCLA where he concentrated his studies on Cinematography and Screenwriting.

Aguilar wrote, directed and produced the film Madraza, an action black comedy about a housewife that becomes an assassin for money, which was picked up by the Walt Disney Company and distributed by Buena Vista International.

Filmography 
 Madraza (2017)

Awards 
Sitges Film Festival

Paraguay International Film Festival

Fantaspoa International Film Festival

Nominations 
 2006 Ariel Awards for Best Editing for 7 días
2018 Condor de Plata Awards for Best Feature Film Opera Prima

External links

References 

 https://www.imdb.com/name/nm1231289/

Living people
Argentine screenwriters
Male screenwriters
Argentine male writers
Argentine film directors
University of California, Los Angeles alumni
Writers from Buenos Aires
Year of birth missing (living people)